Cold Fever is an Iranian Drama, Crime series. The series is directed by Alireza Afkhami. The series has also been aired on iFilm since February 2020.

Storyline 
Shahab Kianfar (Shahab Hosseini) his factory is on the verge of bankruptcy, However, he tries to compete with his father-in-wife, He has prepared a luxurious life for his wife and by borrowing money, Save his factory. As Shahab's financial situation worsens, he decides to solve his problems by drawing up a plan and getting help from the Husband (Hamid Goudarzi) of a person who is nursing his child and has just been released from prison, But in the meantime, a murder happens, Which causes a police detective (Soroush Sehhat) to enter the story...

Cast 
 Shahab Hosseini
 Hamid Goudarzi
 Kambiz Dirbaz
 Solmaz Ghani
 Soroush Sehhat
 Shahrzad Abdolmajid
 Ilia Shahidifar
 Mehdi Solooki
 Mohsen Zahtab
 Farhad Jaberi Yazdi
 Mohammad Reza Kohestani

References

External links
 

2000s Iranian television series
Iranian drama television series